Atbağı is a village in the Beşiri District of Batman Province in Turkey. The village is populated by Kurds of the Reman tribe and had a population of 146 in 2021.

References 

Villages in Beşiri District
Kurdish settlements in Batman Province